Prorastomus sirenoides is an extinct species of primitive sirenian that lived during the Eocene Epoch 40 million years ago in Jamaica.

Taxonomy

The genus name Prorastomus comes from Greek prora meaning "prow" and Latin stomus meaning "mouth." In 1892, naturalist Richard Lydekker respelled it as Prorastoma with a feminine ending, however this was unjustified as stomus is masculine in Latin.

Prorastomus is one of two genera of the family Prorastomidae, the other Pezosiren. These two species are the oldest sirenians, dating to the Eocene.

The first specimen was described by paleontologist Sir Richard Owen in 1855, and, being found in Jamaica in the Yellow Limestone Group, pointed to the origin of Sirenia as being in the New World rather than the Old World as was previously thought. However, the modern understanding of Afrotheria as a clade that originally diversified in Africa overturns this idea. The holotype specimen, BMNH 44897, comprises a skull, jaw, and atlas of the neck vertebrae. When Owen first acquired the skull, it was broken in two between the eyes and the braincase. Another specimen was found in 1989 in the same formation, USNM 437769, comprising the frontal bone, a tusk, vertebrae fragments, and ribs.

Description
While modern sirenians are fully aquatic, the  Prorastomus was predominantly terrestrial, judging from the structure of its skull. Judging from its crown-shaped molars and the shape of its snout, it fed on soft plants. The snout is long, narrow, and, at the tip, bulbous. The nasal bones are larger than other sirenians. The nasal ridge is well developed, indicating it had a good sense of smell. The frontal bones are smaller than usual for sirenians, though, as in other sirenians, it had a pronounced brow ridge. Since Pezosiren has a sagittal crest, it is possible the Prorastomus specimen had one too before being eroded away.

See also 

Evolution of sirenians
Pezosiren

References

Barry Cox, Colin Harrison, R. J. G. Savage, and Brian Gardiner. (1999): The Simon & Schuster Encyclopedia of Dinosaurs and Prehistoric Creatures: A Visual Who's Who of Prehistoric Life. Simon & Schuster. 
David Norman. (2001): The Big Book Of Dinosaurs. Pg. 348, Welcome Books.
Richard Owen. (1855): On the fossil skull of a mammal (Prorastomus sirenoïdes, Owen) from the island of Jamaica. The Quarterly journal of the Geological Society of London, 11, pp. 541–543.

Eocene mammals of North America
Eocene sirenians
Transitional fossils
Prehistoric monotypic mammal genera
Taxa named by Richard Owen
Fossil taxa described in 1855
Paleogene Jamaica
Fossils of Jamaica
Prehistoric placental genera